Spirocodon is a monotypic genus of hydrozoans with Spirocodon saltatrix as the only species in the genus. It is found in the north-western Pacific Ocean, and was first described in 1818 by the German naturalist and explorer Wilhelm Gottlieb Tilesius von Tilenau.

References

Further reading
 

Monotypic cnidarian genera
Corynidae
Hydrozoan genera